Arsenis Maroulis (born 1978) is a retired Greek water polo player and water polo coach, currently coaching G.S. Peristeriou. Maroulis played for Greek powerhouse Olympiacos with whom he won the 2001–02 LEN Champions League in Budapest, being also runner-up of the 2000–01 LEN Champions League in Dubrovnik.

Maroulis was part of the Olympiacos squad that won the 2002 Triple Crown (LEN Champions League, Greek Championship, Greek Cup).

References

External links
 Olympiacos–Honved 9–7 2002 LEN Champions League final full game – Olympiacos line-up (sec. 40) 
 Jug–Olympiacos 5–8 2002 LEN Champions League semi-final (in Croatian)

1978 births
Living people
Olympiacos Water Polo Club players
Greek male water polo players
Greek water polo coaches